Taliesin Axelrod Armstrong Jaffe (born January 19, 1977) is an American voice actor, voice director and screenwriter. He has worked on English-dubbing roles for anime and video games. He is a cast member on Critical Role, a web series in which he plays Dungeons & Dragons with other voice actors. Jaffe has also frequently voiced The Flash in various video games.

Personal life
Jaffe was born in Los Angeles. He is the son of actress Nina Axelrod and film producer Robert Jaffe. His maternal grandfather was screenwriter George Axelrod, while his paternal grandfather was film producer Herb Jaffe. He has two brothers and a sister. Jaffe came out as bisexual in 2017.

Career
Jaffe began his career as a child actor, appearing in films such as Mr. Mom and 2010: The Year We Make Contact. On television, he had guest appearances on such series as The Facts of Life and Amazing Stories. In 1985, Jaffe was a regular on the short-lived ABC sitcom Hail to the Chief as Willy Mansfield, son of the first (fictional) female President of the United States, who was played by Patty Duke. From 1987 to 1989, Jaffe played Kenny Granger on She's the Sheriff, co-starring with Suzanne Somers. In a 2018 interview, Jaffe discussed how he was offered the role of Brian Tanner on ALF but indicated that his parents turned it down. 

After several years, Jaffe did not enjoy being a child actor. After a bad audition, his father told him he could either put in more effort for more roles or quit acting, and  not previously realized that quitting was an  chose to quit. He returned to a career in entertainment a few years later, being a voice actor for dubbing anime in 2000. Since then, he has taken just two small onscreen roles for House MD and House of Demons.

In Critical Role, he played Percival "Percy" Fredrickstein von Musel Klossowski de Rolo III in Campaign One, Mollymauk Tealeaf, Caduceus Clay and Kingsley Tealeaf in Campaign Two, and Ashton Greymoore in Campaign Three. Critical Role was both the Webby Winner and the People's Voice Winner in the "Games (Video Series & Channels)" category at the 2019 Webby Awards; the show was also both a Finalist and the Audience Honor Winner in the "Games" category at the 2019 Shorty Awards. The show was originally broadcast on the Geek & Sundry network until early 2019, when the cast and crew left to set up their own production company, Critical Role Productions. Soon after, they aimed to raise $750,000 on Kickstarter to create an animated series of their first campaign, but ended up raising over $11 million. In November 2019, Amazon Prime Video acquired the streaming rights to the animated series The Legend of Vox Machina; Jaffe reprised his role as Percy.

Acting credits
The lists in this section are purposely incomplete and mention only his most notable roles or projects.

Anime

Animation

Live-action

Video games

Production credits

Voice director

Anime

Video games

Screenwriter

References

External links

Taliesin Jaffe at the CrystalAcids Anime Voice Actor Database

1977 births
Living people
20th-century American male actors
21st-century American male actors
American male child actors
American male screenwriters
American male video game actors
American male voice actors
American television writers
Bisexual male actors
American bisexual actors
American LGBT screenwriters
LGBT people from California
Male actors from Los Angeles
American male television writers
American voice directors
Screenwriters from California